Reality is What You Can Get Away With is an illustrated screenplay by Robert Anton Wilson first published in 1993, followed  by a revised edition in 1996.

References

1993 plays
Discordianism
Consciousness studies
Books by Robert Anton Wilson